The Campus Pond at the University of Massachusetts Amherst is a pond located in the center of campus that was created in the early 1890s. It is bordered to the south by the Fine Arts Center.

History
In the early years, the pond was dammed during the winter of 1890 and 1891 by two students. Damming a river that ran through campus, the pond was justified as a source of natural ice in the days before refrigeration. Over the years, the pond was used for various student activities, as well as numerous events,  including the Spring Concert.

Over the years, the number of Canada geese has increased around the pond, a direct result of increased acreage of lawns around the region. Furthermore, their waste has combined to create a nuisance for pedestrians in and around the pond, as well as foul the pond with algae growth.

References

External links
Official history
Video showing the 2010 dredging of the pond

University of Massachusetts Amherst
Lakes of Hampshire County, Massachusetts
Ponds of Massachusetts